Jenee Fleenor is an American musician. A singer-songwriter, she plays the fiddle, mandolin and acoustic guitar and has performed with various musicians and bands. In 2019, she became the first woman to be nominated and to win the Country Music Association's Musician of the Year and the first fiddle player to win the award in over 20 years.  She has subsequently won the award a further three consecutive times.  

Fleenor has performed with artists including Jon Pardi, Blake Shelton, Steven Tyler, Terri Clark, Martina McBride, Cody Johnson, and Rascal Flatts. She has written songs for many of the same musicians, as well as Dolly Parton, Gretchen Wilson, Kathy Mattea, Montgomery Gentry, Del McCoury and Gord Bamford.

Early life

Fleenor was born in Springdale, Arkansas. She started learning to play the violin when she was three-years-old. She studied the Suzuki method of playing. She played alongside her parents, with her mother playing the piano and her father the violin.

Fleenor started playing the fiddle, at the age of five, after hearing the song Faded Love by Bob Wills. She became a fiddle player for the band at a local opry house when she was ten. She found influence in the playing of many Nashville musicians including Brent Mason, Paul Franklin, Rob Hajacos, Mark O’Connor, Ricky Skaggs, Steve Warner and Vince Gill to name a few.

She relocated to Nashville, Tennessee in 2001 to attend college. She sat in with a bluegrass band during a show and Larry Cordle asked her a few days later to perform with him. She quit college and became full time musician.

Career

Fleenor plays fiddle, mandolin and acoustic guitar. She also is a singer-songwriter.

Early in her career, she toured with Martina McBride and Terri Clark. In the 2010s, she began playing mandolin and acoustic guitar to compensate for low industry demand for fiddle. She was named the Country Music Association's Touring Musician of the Year in 2015. She began performing with Jon Pardi, a neotraditional singer-songwriter credited with helping to keep traditional instruments in popular country. She performed fiddle on Pardi's 2019 album Heartache Medication, including the song by the same title.

In 2019, she released her debut album, Fiddle & Steel. That same year, she was nominated for, and awarded, the Country Music Association's Musician of the Year Award, the first for a woman. That same year, she was nominated for the Academy of Country Music's Speciality Instrument Player of the Year Award, the only woman to ever be nominated for the award. Fleenor has toured with Steven Tyler, Jon Pardi and Blake Shelton. She also performed in the house band on The Voice.

In 2023 she helped launch an American acoustic all-star band, Wood Box Heroes with Josh Martin, Barry Bales, Seth Taylor and Matt Menefee.

Awards and nominations

References

External links

American bluegrass fiddlers
American country fiddlers
People from Springdale, Arkansas
Country musicians from Arkansas
Living people
21st-century American composers
21st-century American women guitarists
21st-century American guitarists
21st-century American women singers
21st-century American women writers
American country singer-songwriters
American women country singers
American women singer-songwriters
Country musicians from Tennessee
Year of birth missing (living people)
21st-century women composers
21st-century American singers
Singer-songwriters from Tennessee
Singer-songwriters from Arkansas